Pterolophia dorsotuberculare is a species of beetles in the family Cerambycidae. It was described by Japanese Masao Hayashi in 1984.

References

dorsotuberculare
Beetles described in 1984